The discography of Bowling for Soup, an American rock band based in Wichita Falls, Texas, consists of 10 studio albums, one live album/live DVD, four compilation albums, three extended plays, 18 singles, and 25 music videos.

A Hangover You Don't Deserve was the most successful album for the band, earning a Gold certification from the Recording Industry Association of America. They have sold over 5 million albums over the course of their career.

Albums

Studio albums

Split albums

Live albums

Compilation albums

Extended plays

Singles

Videography

Video albums

Music videos

Other appearances

 In an episode of My Name Is Earl, Earl's brother, Randy Hickey, sings "High School Never Ends."
 "1985" was featured on an episode of Pimp my Ride in the UK.
 The band performed several more songs on the Phineas and Ferb soundtrack credited as the fictional band Love Handel.

References

External links
 Official site

Discographies of American artists
Pop punk group discographies